The Savant Investment Group, LLC is an independent, fee-only wealth management advisory group. Headquartered in Oakland, California, the company has 12 employees.  In 2006, the company exceeded $1,000,000,000 in managed assets.

Former names: Savant Russell, Burkhart Pension, The Savant Group, Savant Advisors

History
After several mergers the company became Savant Russel in 1991. The company was founded by Thomas Burkhart as a financial advisory firm for wealthy individuals.  The company's typical account size was worth $2 to $3 Million.

In 1993 the company moved from Menlo Park, California to the historical Schmidt Lithography Co. Clock Tower in San Francisco.  In 2011 the company changed its name from The Savant Group to Savant Investment Group, LLC.  In 2016, the company moved from San Francisco, California to Oakland.

References

 https://investingstockonline.com/what-are-binary-options/

Financial services companies of the United States